The Battle of Moshchun was a series of military engagements for control of the village of Moshchun and its surroundings during the initial phase of the 2022 Russian invasion of Ukraine. The battle lasted from 5 March to 21 March 2022, and has been described as "one of the fiercest and most important battles during the defense of Kyiv."

Background 
After Russian Ground Forces took control of Hostomel airport on 25 February 2022, the main group of Russian forces launched a massive offensive on Kyiv from Belarus through the Chernobyl exclusion zone. In the course of a rapid advance, Russian troops took control of Chernobyl, Ivankiv, Dymer, and Borodyanka. They also  reached the outskirts of Bucha.

In order to deter the Russian advance, Ukrainian troops blew up the bridges crossing the Irpin River as they retreated. Shelling and fighting continued along the river for several days.

On March 5, after the capture of the Bucha-Hostomel line by Russian forces, units of the 76th Guards Air Assault Division and the 98th Guards Airborne Division were sent to cross the Irpin River near the village of Moshchun.

Battle 
On March 5, a small number of Russian special forces entered and occupied the northwestern part of Moshchun.

On the morning of March 6, a significant number Russian troops began to cross the river. At that time, the defense of Moshchun was held by a company of the 72nd Mechanized Brigade.  Under pressure, Ukrainian forces retreated to the center of the village and regrouped. Later on, Ukrainian special forces armed with anti-tank weapons arrived as reinforcements. The Russians continuously attacked the village with "Grads", artillery fire, mortar shelling, airstrikes, drones, and attack helicopters. Russian forces also disabled Ukrainian drones and communications the area using electronic warfare tactics.

By mid‐March, Russian forces still faced fierce resistance from Ukrainian defenders in the neighboring city of Irpin, as well as other areas west of the capital.  Having failed to break through Ukrainian defenses in these areas, the Russian army chose to prioritize advancing on Kyiv through Moshchun.

At the beginning of the war, part of the Kozarovichi dam was blown up to allow water from the Kyiv reservoir to enter the Irpin River in an effort to raise its level and create a natural barrier. The river exceeded its banks by 1.5–2 meters, making crossings difficult. The flooding made it almost impossible for Russian troops stationed at Hostomel Airport to reach Moshchun, which they considered as a gateway to Kyiv.  

On March 11, Russian troops launched a massive assault on Moshchun from all sides. Ukrainian troops brought reinforcements into the village in an attempt to repel the offensive. Under the influence of heavy artillery fire, Ukrainian forces gradually retreated to the outskirts of the village over the following days. In the aftermath, Ukrainian troops set up defensive positions in the forest near Moshchun.

By 13 March, Ukrainian sources claimed that the 155th Separate Marine Brigade had suffered around 600 killed and another 600 wounded during the battle so far. Around March 14, Oleksandr Vdovychenko, the commander of the 72nd Mechanized Brigade, offered to the Commander-in-Chief of the Armed Forces of Ukraine, Valerii Zaluzhnyi to retreat from Moshchun. The General replied by saying "If you move away, then Kyiv" and "We will look for forces and means". The command decided to continue the defense of the village and change its tactics. Vdovychenko began to rotate troops every three days, saying "Due to the density of shelling and the cold, it was impossible [for them] to stay longer." He also introduced a new battalion into the battle. 

A few days later, Ukrainian units surrounded Moshchun on two sides, and began to heavily shell the Russian troop concentrations and river crossings in the village.  The Ukrainian army then pushed Russian troops back to the Irpin River.

On March 21, the Armed Forces of Ukraine completely liberated the village of Moshchun from Russian occupation.

Military value 
Moshchun became an important defense outpost of Kyiv.  Russian forces saw the village of Moshchun as a strategic position they needed to control to capture Kyiv. To this end, the Russian army sent many qualified troops, Jet artillery, mortars, and aircraft to capture the village. Despite the difficult situation, the Ukrainian army stopped the Russian offensive, and later managed to push Russian troops to the left bank of the Irpin River.

Aftermath 
Russian losses at Moshchun, Irpin, Makariv, and other nearby settlements contributed to their decision to completely withdraw from Kyiv Oblast.

During the battle, about 2,000 of the 2,800 buildings in Moshchun were destroyed.

References 

Moshchun
March 2022 events in Ukraine
Kyiv offensive (2022)